Customer Success, Customer Success Management, or Client Advocacy is the process of increasing customers' satisfaction while using a product or service. Customer Success Management is a specialized form of customer relationship management. An effective customer success strategy typically results in decreased customer churn and increased up-sell opportunities. The goal of customer success is to make the customer as successful as possible, which in turn, improves customer lifetime value (CLTV) for the company.

Metrics 

 NPS – “Net Promoter Score” is a management tool that can be used to gauge the loyalty of a firm's customer relationships. It serves as an alternative to traditional customer satisfaction research and is claimed to be correlated with revenue growth.
 CSAT – “Customer Satisfaction” is a score that indicates how satisfied a customer is with a specific product, transaction, or interaction with a company. The term “CSAT” is most often used in the context of a “CSAT score,” which describes a numerical measure of customer satisfaction.
 CES – “Customer Effort Score” (or “Net Easy Score”) is a single-item metric that measures how much effort a customer has to exert to get an issue resolved, a request fulfilled, a product purchased/returned or a question answered.
 Churn – Churn rate, when applied to a customer base, refers to the proportion of contractual customers or subscribers who leave a supplier during a given time period.
 Health score – Consolidated score which summarizes the overall situation of each customer.

Key sub-functions 
Key functions of a customer success (CS) team include:

 Technical Enablement: While the scope and level of effort (LOE) can vary drastically from a few hours to many person-years, almost every software solution, and generally any innovation, requires some level of initial setting and enablement. This activity can also be referred to as Initial Implementation or the Customer On-boarding and Initial Engagement. This is normally the first step after the initial sale of the solution and any add-on component of it and is normally governed by a statement of work (SOW) that defined the deliverables the software provider commits to provide, the timeframe for it and the commercial structure for the engagement. In many organizations, the team responsible for this function is referred to as professional services.
Knowledge Enablement: providing the customer with the knowledge needed to make best use of the solution is a function that can sometimes be independent from the technical enablement function. Formal and informal training are part of this function as well as customer-to-customer relations (like community sites) and self-service knowledge systems.
Identifying Growth Opportunity: During the lifecycle of the contract, the customer success Manager (CSM) will have direct access to conversations around growth of the clients business. It is a key function of the role to stand in as a "trusted adviser" and help identify expansion opportunities, either in scope of feature or function expansion.
Identifying Churn Risk: Utilizing a Customer Health score is pivotal in identifying churn (or lost revenue). As the main point of contact for accounts, the CSM has visibility into the possibility of churn/cancelled accounts. The CSM can intervene when needed to help decrease the likelihood of a lost account.
General Account Management: While customer success is a more robust solution to account management, there is a good portion of the day-to-day that falls under the "account management' title. CS is the team that manages the business relations between the customer and the provider. This function operates in parallel with the technical teams and is working with the customer to ensure they best utilize the provider's capabilities, expand and improve them. They will work to increase adoption of the solution, ensure renewal and expansion of contracts and manage executive relations. This includes being an advocate for the customer to various groups within an organization.

Customer Success Managers 
Presently, the customer success function within most organizations is embodied in the customer success manager (CSM), client relationship manager (CRM), or client strategy consultant (CSC) job titles.

Customer success managers (CSM) act as the main point of contact and as a trusted advisor for the customer from the vendor side as they are the ones ultimately responsible and accountable for that customer's success. The function may share many of the same functions of traditional account managers, relationship managers, project managers, and technical account managers, but their mode of operations tend to be much more focused on long-term value-generation to the customer. At its heart, it is about maximizing the value the customer generates from utilizing the solutions of the vendor, while enabling the vendor the ability to derive high return from the customer value. To enable that, the CSM must monitor the customer's usage of and satisfaction from the solutions of the vendor, identify opportunities and challenges from the way the customer engages with the solution and take action to help resolve challenges and foster expansion of the usage as well as the value from the solutions (to both sides) over time.

As a consequence, relentlessly monitoring and managing the customer health is a key success factor for every CSM as well as the need to deeply understand the drivers of value the customer gains from the solutions provided by the vendor. Without such deep and timely understanding of these two aspects of the customer, the CSM would not be able to act effectively.

In young organizations where the total number of employees (and customers) is small, the CSM may be the first employee of the customer success team. As such, they will be responsible for most of the functions described above, which over time may be fulfilled by more specialized team members. Ownership of commercial responsibilities by CSM vary among companies. While some believe a CSM's neutrality from sales or commercial conversations may make a customer more likely to respond to and engage with a CSM, others view the ownership of the commercial relations as natural to a long-term relationship between a vendor and a customer and more empowering to the CSM.

For CSMs to fulfill the responsibilities of their role, they must be empowered by an organization's executive team to navigate freely among all parts of an organization. This maintains the CSMs credibility with the customer as an effective resource. In organizations where CSMs are just another level of abstraction or a "screen" between the customer and the resources they need, the credibility of the CSM is compromised and the customer experience eroded which may result in a customer not renewing or expanding their business with the vendor. Furthermore, lacking the top-down support will deprive the CSM the ability to garner the right resources needed by them to complete their jobs.

Virtual customer success managers (VCSM) 
Virtual customer success managers are remote points of contact for customers and monitor the success of customers, providing important feedback.

Background/history 

Every company that sells its products and/or services to customers has functions responsible for managing the customer fulfillment and relations. In traditional businesses, those functions are referred to most commonly as "Fulfillment", "Post Sales" or "Professional Services".

In the world of technology, companies have been developing, selling and enabling software solutions for many years. At most of those companies the function responsible for managing the relations with customers used to be called "Account Management", "Operations" or "Services".

As the business world is changing and evolving into new fields, the method by which software is enabled to customers changes. One of the most significant changes in recent years has been the emergence of software as a service (aka SaaS).

SaaS is a method of enabling a software solution to customers in a subscription model that departs from the "old" model of granting a perpetual license that enables the customer to own the solution and therefore use it as they see fit (but also be responsible for its operation). Rather, when enabling a solution to customers as a SaaS, companies offer their products as services instead of physical objects, moving the economy to a subscription model. The customer "rents" the solution and is able to use it only for the period they have rented it for. The vendor enabling the solution provides not only the solution itself, but also the infrastructure that supports it.

The key implication of this new model is a fundamental shift in the engagement model between the software vendor and its customers. If in the traditional "enterprise software" model, a customer buys the license to the software and pays the vendor then, regardless of its actual usage, in a SaaS model, the customer pays a (much smaller) rent for the software every month. The software vendor must therefore ensure the customer is using the solution and seeing value from it if they wanted to ensure the customer continues to pay their rent. This fundamental shift in the software industry's operating model revealed a need for a function at the company to own and ensure that success of its customers.

The emergence of this function is what is now being referred to as customer success (CS).

While the trend towards SaaS has been going on since the beginning of the 21st century, the understanding of the need for much stronger focus on customer success and therefore the creation of the field of customer success only began around 2010–2012.

The CS function is responsible for retaining and growing the business that the sales team has secured. Case studies show that companies with strong CS teams outperform peers with weak or no CS teams in a multitude of financial criteria including customer retention (also measured by "churn", which is the opposite of retention), revenue growth rates, gross margin, customer satisfaction, and referrals. In fact, customer experience is the greatest untapped source of both decreased costs and increased revenue in most industries, but only if companies take the time to understand what underpins it and how they can benefit financially from improving it.

References

External links 

 What I do & how much I make – Khan Academy's YouTube video about a customer success manager

Business process
Customer experience